GLOBALG.A.P. is a farm assurance program, translating consumer requirements into Good Agricultural Practice. EurepGAP is a common standard for farm management practice created in the late 1990s by several European supermarket chains and their major suppliers. GAP is an acronym for Good Agricultural Practices. It is now the world's most widely implemented farm certification scheme. Most European customers for agricultural products now demand evidence of EurepGAP certification as a prerequisite for doing business.

The standard was developed using the Hazard Analysis and Critical Control Points (HACCP) guidelines published by the United Nations Food and Agriculture Organization, and is governed according to the ISO/IEC 17065 for product certification schemes. Unlike other farm certification schemes, it has definitive rules for growers to follow, and each production unit is assessed by independent third party auditors. These auditors work for commercial certification companies who are licensed by the EurepGAP secretariat to conduct audits and award certificates where merited.

In September 2007, EurepGAP changed its name to GLOBALG.A.P.. The decision was taken to reflect its expanding international role in establishing Good Agricultural Practices between multiple retailers and their suppliers. GLOBALG.A.P. Numbers (GGNs) are linked to producers, and Chain of Custody (CoC). A series of the standards can be accessed online.

In February 2009 GLOBALG.A.P. launched 'ChinaGAP' following successful completion of the benchmarking of ChinaGAP against the GLOBALG.A.P. Good Agricultural Practice reference code.

See also 
 Agriculture ministry
 Global Food Safety Initiative (GFSI)
 Good Agricultural Practices

Notes

External links 
 GLOBALG.A.P. Website

Standards organisations in Germany
Agricultural organisations based in Germany